Mohamed Abdel Hakim Amer (11 December 1919 – 13 September 1967) was an Egyptian military officer and politician. Amer served in the 1948 Arab–Israeli War, and played a leading role in the military coup that overthrew King Farouk in 1952.  After leading Egyptian forces in the 1956 Suez war, he was appointed Minister for Defense by President Gamal Abdel Nasser and was Egyptian Vice President between 1958 to 1965.

Early life and education
Amer was born in Samalut, in the El Minya on 11 December 1919. He was from an affluent family, and his father was a land owner and village mayor. His uncle served as the minister of war during the reign of King Farouk.

After finishing school, Amer attended the Egyptian Military Academy and graduated in 1938. He was commissioned into the Egyptian Army in 1939.

Military career

Amer served in the 1948 Arab–Israeli War, took part in the 1952 Revolution and commanded the Egyptian Army in the Suez Crisis, the North Yemen Civil War and the Six-Day War.

Amer played a leading role in the military coup that overthrew King Farouk in 1952 and brought General Muhammad Naguib and Colonel Gamal Abdel Nasser to power. The following year, Amer was promoted straight from major to major-general, bypassing four military ranks, and was made Egypt's Chief of the General Staff.<ref>Tucker and Roberts, Encyclopedia," 2008, 99.</ref> In 1956, Amer was appointed commander-in-chief of the joint military command established by Egypt and Syria. He also led Egyptian forces against both Israeli and allied British-French forces during the 1956 Suez war. After the fighting ended, Amer accused Nasser of provoking an unnecessary war and then blaming the military for the result. As Nasser's representative in Syria, Amer was detained by rebels during the 1961 Syrian coup d'état and sent back to Cairo.

In March 1964, Amer was made first vice-president to Nasser and deputy supreme commander, with the power to rule for 60 days if the president was incapacitated. Amer's distinguished career came to a sudden end after Egypt's crushing defeat by Israel in the Six-Day War of June 1967. Many historians, including Hazem Kandil, have stated that much of the responsibility for the Egyptian military's failure in the 1967 war can be laid at the feet of Amer. This was because Amer's control of the Egyptian military establishment was in line with President Gamal Abdel-Nasser's general policy of making different government institutions fiefdoms to those most loyal to him. In addition, the proxy war Egypt (with Soviet backing) fought against the Saudis, Western powers and Israelis in the North Yemen Civil War (1962–1970), with Nasser supporting the Yemen Arab Republic against the Western and Saudi Arabian backed Royalists, is also viewed as being key to Egypt's defeat in the 1967 Middle East war; as nearly half of the Egypt's Western-trained officer-corps (mostly in Britain at Sandhurst) were in Yemen at the time of the initial Israeli attack on Egypt.

When Amer heard of the fall of Abu Ageila to Israel, he was said to have panicked and ordered all units in the Sinai to retreat. This order effectively meant the defeat of Egypt. On 17 June 1967 shortly after the Six Day War ended, Amer was relieved of all his duties and forced into early retirement.

Arrest and contested cause of death
In August 1967, Amer, along with over 50 Egyptian military officers and two former ministers, including Shams Badran, were arrested for allegedly plotting a coup to overthrow Gamal Abdel Nasser. Amer was kept under house arrest at his villa in Giza.

According to the official Egyptian position, Amer was rushed to hospital on 13 September 1967 in an attempt to save his life after he attempted suicide by swallowing "a large amount of poison pills" upon the arrival of Egyptian officers to question him. After surviving and being taken home, he managed to evade his guards and swallow more pills he kept hidden under an adhesive plaster on his leg. Later, Cairo radio announced his burial in his home village of Astal.

Another version of the circumstances surrounding Amer's death held that Amer was approached at his house on 13 September by high-ranking Egyptian officers and given a choice: to stand trial for treason, which would inevitably have ended with his conviction and execution, or to die an honourable death by taking poison. Amer chose the latter option and received a full military burial. Anwar Al Sadat, who later became President of Egypt, expressed his opinion that if he was in Amer's position, he would have done the same soon after the Six-Day War.

In September 2012, Amer's family filed a case to investigate his death. They claimed that he was murdered. Also, in a statement translated from Al-Masry Al-Youm'' published on 5 May 2015, the family's lawyer cited reports confirming that Amer's death was not self-inflicted, including an interview with Anwar Sadat's widow published on 26 April of that year.

Foreign awards and honours
 :
 Recipient of the Hero of the Soviet Union (1964)
 :
 Honorary Grand Commander of the Order of the Defender of the Realm (SMN (K)) - Tun (1965)

References

External links

20th-century Egyptian politicians
1919 births
1967 suicides
Defence Ministers of Egypt
Egyptian Military Academy alumni
Egyptian revolutionaries
Field marshals of Egypt
Foreign Heroes of the Soviet Union
Free Officers Movement (Egypt)
Heroes of the Soviet Union
People from Minya Governorate
People of the Suez Crisis
Suicides by poison
Recipients of the Order of Lenin
Honorary Grand Commanders of the Order of the Defender of the Realm
Vice-presidents of Egypt
Chiefs of the General Staff (Egypt)
Egyptian people of the 1948 Arab–Israeli War